

Switches by Democrats

Democratic to Republican

1800–1899
 1855 – Reuben Fenton, while U.S. Representative from New York (1853–1855 and 1857–1864), later Governor of New York (1865–1868) & U.S. Senator from New York (1869–1875). 
 1856 – Hannibal Hamlin, while U.S. Senator for Maine (1848–1861 and 1869–1881), later Governor of Maine (1857) and 15th vice president of the United States (1861–1865) during the first term of Abraham Lincoln
 1856 – Simon Cameron, while U.S. Senator from Pennsylvania (1857–1861 and 1867–1877) and United States Secretary of War (1861–1862)
 1856 – Galusha A. Grow, while U.S. Representative from Pennsylvania (1851–1863 and 1894–1903), later 28th Speaker of the United States House of Representatives (1861–1863)
 1856 – Glenni William Scofield, while U.S. Representative from Pennsylvania (1863–1875)
 1860s – Ambrose Burnside, erstwhile House candidate, later Union General and Governor and Senator (Rhode Island)
 1860s – Benjamin Franklin Butler, later became U.S. Representative from Massachusetts (1867–1875 and 1877–1879) and Governor of Massachusetts (1883–1884)
 1860s – James M. Hinds, later U.S. Representative from Arkansas (1868)
 1864 – Thompson Campbell, former U.S. Representative from Illinois (1851–1853)
 1865 – John A. Logan, while U.S. Representative from Illinois, later U.S. Senator from Illinois (1871–1877 and 1879–1886)
 1867 – John Adams Dix, former United States Secretary of the Treasury (1861) & U.S. Senator from New York (1845–1849); later elected as Governor of New York (1873–1874)
 1869 – David P. Lewis, later Governor of Alabama (1872–1874)
 1870 – James Lawrence Orr, former Speaker of the United States House of Representatives (1857–1859) and U.S. Representative (1849–1859), later Governor of South Carolina (1865–1868)
 1893 – James A. Walker, Lieutenant Governor of Virginia (1878–1882), later U.S. Representative for Virginia (1895–1899)

1900–1949
 1911 – Octaviano Ambrosio Larrazolo, later Governor of New Mexico (1919–1921) and U.S. Senator from New Mexico (1928–1929)
 1933 – Raymond Moley, adviser to President Franklin D. Roosevelt
 1939 – Wendell Willkie, later Republican nominee for president in 1940
 1940 – Jack Porter, challenger to Lyndon Johnson in the 1948 Texas Senate elections.
 1946 – Rudolph G. Tenerowicz, former U.S. Representative from Michigan (1939–1943)
 1947 – John Aspinwall Roosevelt, Son of President Franklin D. Roosevelt
 1948 – J. Thomas Watson, while Florida Attorney General. He left the Democratic Party over its pro-civil rights platform.
 1949 – Joseph A. McArdle, former U.S. Representative from Pennsylvania (1939–1942)
 1949 – Rush D. Holt Sr., former U.S. Senator from West Virginia (1935–1941)
 1949 – William C. Cramer, later U.S. Representative from Florida (1955–1971)

1950–1959
 1951 – John Tower, later became U.S. Senator from Texas (1961–1985)
 1952 – Henry Hyde, later became U.S. Representative from Illinois (1975–2007)
 1955 – Ben Adamowski, later Cook County State's Attorney (1956–1960)
 1958 – Odell Pollard
 1959 – Francis Grevemberg, former Louisiana State Police Superintendent
 1959 – Dud Lastrapes, later mayor of Lafayette, Louisiana

1960–1969
1960s – Arthur Ravenel Jr., South Carolina State Representative, later U.S. Representative from South Carolina (1987–1995)
1960 – Claude R. Kirk Jr., later Governor of Florida (1967–1971)
1960 – Robert Daniel, U.S. Representative from Virginia 
1962 – Dave Treen, later U.S. Representative from Louisiana (1973–1980) and Governor of Louisiana (1980–1984)
1962 – James D. Martin, later U.S. Representative from Alabama (1965–1967)
1962 – Ronald Reagan, while an actor and former Screen Actors Guild president. Later 33rd Governor of California (1967–1975) and 40th President of the United States (1981–1989)
1962 – Floyd Spence, South Carolina State Representative, later a U.S. Representative from South Carolina (1971–2001)
1963 – Rubel Phillips, former Mississippi Public Service Commissioner
1963 – Stanford Morse, Mississippi State Senator 
1963 – James H. Boyce
1963 – Edward Lunn Young, U.S. Representative from South Carolina
1964 – William Dickinson, U.S. Representative from Alabama
1964 – Arthur Glenn Andrews, U.S. Representative from Alabama
1964 – Alfred Goldthwaite, Alabama State Representative
1964 – Clarke Reed
1964 – George M. McMath, Virginia House of Delegates
1964 – Faith Whittlesey, United States Ambassador to Switzerland
1964 – Howard Callaway, later U.S. Representative from Georgia (1965–1967) and United States Secretary of the Army (1973–1975)
1964 – Iris Faircloth Blitch, former Georgia U.S. Representative (1955–1963)
1964 – Charles W. Pickering, later Mississippi State senator and judge of the United States District Court for the Southern District of Mississippi (2004)
1964 – Strom Thurmond, while U.S. senator from South Carolina (1954–2003).

1970–1979
1970 – Jesse Helms, later U.S. Senator from North Carolina (1973–2003)
1970 – A. C. Clemons, Louisiana State Senator
1970 – William Oswald Mills, later U.S. Representative from Maryland (1971–1973)
1970 – Bob Barr, later U.S. Representative from Georgia (1995–2003)
1971 – Tillie K. Fowler, later U.S. Representative from Florida (1993–2001)
1972 – Ed Karst, Mayor of Alexandria
1972 – Graham Purcell Jr., former U.S. Representative from Texas (1962–1973)
1972 – Robert R. Neall, later Secretary of the Maryland Department of Health (2018–present)
1972 – Thomas F. Hartnett, former U.S. Representative from South Carolina (1981–1987)
1972 – Trent Lott, later U.S. Representative from Mississippi (1973–1989) and U.S. Senator from Mississippi (1989–2007)
1973 – Mills E. Godwin Jr., former governor of Virginia (1966–1970) and lieutenant Governor of Virginia (1962–1966). Later Governor of Virginia (1974–1978)
1973 – Samuel I. Hayakawa, later U.S. Senator from California (1977–1983)
1973 – John Connally, former United States Secretary of the Treasury (1971–1972) and former governor of Texas (1963–1969)
1975 – Elizabeth Dole, later United States Secretary of Transportation (1983–1987), United States Secretary of Labor (1989–1990) and U.S. Senator from North Carolina (2003–2009)
1975 – John Jarman, while U.S. Representative from Oklahoma (1951–1977)
1976 – Rob Couhig
1977 – A. J. McNamara, Louisiana State Representative
1977 – Lane Carson, Louisiana State Representative
1978 – Robert G. Jones, Louisiana State Senator
1978 – Chris Smith, later U.S. Representative from New Jersey (1981–present). 
1978 – Thomas Bliley, Mayor of Richmond, Virginia, and later U.S. Representative from Virginia (1981–2001)
1978 – Michael F. "Mike" Thompson, Louisiana State Representative
1979 – Charles Grisbaum Jr., Louisiana State Representative
1979 – Ed Scogin, Louisiana State Representative
1979 – Armistead I. Selden Jr., former U.S. Representative from Alabama (1953–1969) and United States Ambassador to New Zealand (1974–1979)

1980–1989
1980s – S. S. DeWitt, Louisiana State Representative
1980s – Mike Pence, U.S Representative for Indiana. Later Governor of Indiana (2013–2017) and Vice President of the United States (2017–2021)
1980 – Sam Yorty, former U.S. Representative for California (1951–1955) and Mayor of Los Angeles (1961–1973)
1980 – Mac Collins, later U.S. Representative from Georgia (1993–2005)
1980 – Jim Donelon, later Louisiana Insurance Commissioner (2006–present)
1980 – Jesse Monroe Knowles, Louisiana State Senator
1980 – Frank D. White, later Governor of Arkansas (1981–1983)
1980 – J.C. "Sonny" Gilbert, Louisiana State Representative
1981 – Bob Stump, while U.S. Representative from Arizona (1977–2003)
1981 – Eugene Atkinson, while U.S. Representative from Pennsylvania (1979–1983) 
1981 – Larry Kudlow, later Director of the National Economic Council (2018–2021)
1982 – Condoleezza Rice, later United States National Security Advisor (2001–2005) and United States Secretary of State (2005–2009)
1982 – Joseph P. Wyatt Jr., former U.S. Representative from Texas (1979–1981)
1983 – Phil Gramm, while U.S. Representative from Texas (1979–1985) and later U.S. Senator from Texas (1985–2002)
1983 – Bob Martinez, while Mayor of Tampa. Later Governor of Florida (1987–1991) and Director of the National Drug Control Policy (1991–1993)
1983 – Edward D.L.G. Pangelinan, while Resident Representative from the Northern Mariana Islands (1978–1984)
1984 – V.J. Bella, Louisiana State Representative
1984 – Andy Ireland, while U.S. Representative from Florida (1977–1993)
1984 – H. Edward Knox, Mayor of the City of Charlotte
1984 – Sonny Callahan, Alabama State Senator. Later U.S Representative from Alabama (1985–2003)
1985 –Syd Hedlog, Former US House of Representatives from Florida (1949–1969)
1985 – Jeane Kirkpatrick, while U.S. Ambassador to the United Nations (1981–1985)
1985 – Edward J. King, former governor of Massachusetts (1979–1983)
1985 – Dexter Lehtinen, Florida State Representative. Later U.S. Attorney for the Southern District of Florida (1988–1992)
1985 – Kent Hance, former U.S. Representative from Texas (1979–1985)
1985 – Jock Scott (politician), Louisiana State Representative
1985 – Carole Keeton Strayhorn, later Texas Comptroller of Public Accounts (1999–2007)
1986 – William Bennett, while U.S. Secretary of Education (1985–1988)
1986 – Richard Baker, Louisiana State Representative. Later U.S. Representative from Louisiana (1987–2008)
1986 – Charles T. Canady, Florida State Representative. Later U.S. Representative from Florida (1993–2001), Justice of the Supreme Court of Florida (2008–present) and Chief Justice of the Supreme Court of Florida (2010–2012)
1986 – Frank Rizzo, former mayor of Philadelphia
1986 – James David Santini, former U.S. Representative from Nevada (1975–1983)
1987 – Paul Hardy, former secretary of state of Louisiana (1976–1980), later Lieutenant Governor of Louisiana (1988–1992)
1987 – Roy Moore, later Chief Justice of the Alabama Supreme Court (2001–2003)
 1987 – Sam Panayotovich, Illinois State Representative and political ally of Vrdolyak.
1987 – James C. Smith, Attorney General of Florida (1979–1987), later Florida Secretary of State (1987–1995)
1988 – Jim McCrery, later U.S. Representative from Louisiana (1988–2009)
1988 – David Duke, Louisiana State Representative
1988 – Mike Johanns, later Governor of Nebraska (1999–2005), United States Secretary of Agriculture (2005–2007) and U.S. Senator from Nebraska (2009–2015)
 1988 – John Rice, Alabama State Senator
1989 – John Amari, Alabama State Senator
1989 – Pete Johnson, while State Auditor of Mississippi (1988–1992)
1989 – Bill Grant, while U.S. Representative from Florida (1987–1991)
1989 – Tommy F. Robinson, while U.S. Representative from Arkansas (1985–1991)
1989 – Rick Perry, Agriculture Commissioner of Texas. Later Governor of Texas (2000–2015)
1989 – W. Fox McKeithen, Secretary of State of Louisiana (1988–2005)

1990–1999
1990 – Jason Chaffetz, later U.S. Representative from Utah (2009–2017)
1990 – Tom Vandergriff, former U.S. Representative from Texas (1983–1985). Later elected as a County Judge (1991–2007)
1990 – Joseph F. Toomy, Louisiana State Representative
1990 – Vito Fossella, later U.S. Representative from New York (1997–2009)
1990 – Lauch Faircloth, later U.S. Senator from North Carolina (1993–1999)
1991 – Bret Schundler, Mayor of Jersey City
1991 – David Beasley, later Governor of South Carolina (1995–1999)
1991 – Buddy Roemer, while Governor of Louisiana (1988–1992)
1992 – Byron Looper, Tennessee State Representative
1993 – Edward H. Krebs, Pennsylvania State Representative
1993 – Don W. Williamson, Louisiana State Senator
1994 – Eli Bebout, Wyoming State Representative
1994 – Ron Gomez, Louisiana State Representative
1994 – Woody Jenkins, Louisiana State Representative
1994 – Ed Austin, while Mayor of Jacksonville
1994 – Walter B. Jones, while running as a Democrat for U.S. Representative from North Carolina. U.S. Representative from North Carolina (1995–2019)
1994 – Ed Whitfield, the day before filing as a candidate for the U.S. House in Kentucky. U.S. Representative from Kentucky (1995–2016)
1994 – Ron Gomez, Louisiana state representative
1994 – Mike Bowers, while Attorney General of Georgia (1981–1997)
1994 – Fob James, former governor of Alabama (1979–1983). Later Governor of Alabama (1995–1999)
1994 – Richard Shelby, while U.S. Senator from Alabama (1987–present)
1995 – Jimmy Hayes, while U.S. Representative from Louisiana (1987–1997)
1995 – Greg Laughlin, while U.S. Representative from Texas (1989–1997)
1995 – Ben Nighthorse Campbell, while U.S. Senator from Colorado (1993–2005)
1995 – Billy Tauzin, while U.S. Representative from Louisiana (1980–2005)
1995 – Nathan Deal, while U.S. Representative from Georgia (1993–2011). Later became the 82nd Governor of Georgia (2011–2019)
1995 – Mike Parker, while U.S. Representative from Mississippi (1989–1999)
1995 – Susana Martinez, later Governor of New Mexico (2011–2019)
1995 – Mike Foster, later Governor of Louisiana (1996–2004)
1995 – Donald Ray Kennard, Louisiana State Representative
1995 – Rusty Crowe, Tennessee State Senator
1995 – Milton H. Hamilton, Jr, Tennessee State Senator
1996 – Ronnie Culbreth, Georgia State Representative.
1996 – Norm Coleman, while Mayor of St Paul. Later U.S. Senator from Minnesota (2003–2009)
1996 – Jay Blossman, later Louisiana Public Service Commissioner (1997–2008)
1996 – John Hoeven, later Governor of North Dakota (2000–2010), later U.S. Senator from North Dakota (2011–present)
1996 - Cleta Mitchell, previously a member of the Oklahoma House of Representatives (1976–1984)
1997 – Steve Windom, Alabama State Senator, later Lieutenant Governor of Alabama (1999–2003)
1997 – Kevin Mannix, Oregon State Representative
1997 – Michael J. Michot, Louisiana House of Representatives
1997 – Chip Bailey, Alabama State Senator
1997 – H. Mac Gipson, Alabama State Representative
1997 – Ronald "Ron" Johnson, Alabama State Representative
1998 – Harry C. Goode Jr., Florida State Representative
1998 – George Wallace Jr., former Alabama State Treasurer (1987–1995)
1998 – Gerald Allen, Alabama State Representative
1998 – Steve Flowers, Alabama State Representative
1998 – Tim Parker Jr., Alabama State Representative
1998 – Herman Badillo, former U.S. Representative from New York (1971–1977)
1998 – David G. Boschert, Maryland State Delegate
1998 – Sonny Perdue, Georgia State Senator. Later became the 81st Governor of Georgia (2003–2011) and the 31st United States Secretary of Agriculture
1999 – Nancy Larraine Hoffmann, New York State Senator

2000–2009
 2000 – Robert J. Barham, Louisiana State Senator
 2000 – Tom McVea, Louisiana State Representative
 2001 – Blaine Galliher, Alabama State Representative
 2001 – Clinton LeSueur
 2001 – Hunt Downer, Louisiana State Representative
 2002 – Amy Tuck, Lieutenant Governor of Mississippi
 2002 – Olga A. Méndez, New York State Senator
 2002 – Don Cheeks, Georgia State Senator
 2002 – Dan Lee, Georgia State Senator
 2002 – Rooney Bowen, Georgia State Senator
 2002 – Jack Hill, Georgia State Senator
 2002 – Terry Burton, Mississippi State Senator
 2002 – Videt Carmichael, Mississippi State Senator
 2002 – Kay Ivey, Alabama State Treasurer (2003–2011), Lieutenant Governor of Alabama (2011–2017), Governor of Alabama (2017–present)
 2003 – James David Cain, Louisiana State Senator
 2003 – Travis Little, Mississippi State Senator
 2003 – Larry Baker, Mississippi State Representative
 2003 – Jim Barnett, Mississippi State Representative
 2003 – Herb Frierson, Mississippi State Representative
 2003 – Frank Hamilton, Mississippi State Representative
 2003 – John Read, Mississippi State Representative
 2003 – Melinda Schwegmann, former lieutenant governor of Louisiana (1992–1996)
 2003 – Rick Sheehy, Mayor of Hastings, Nebraska
 2004 – Ralph Hall, while U.S. Representative from Texas (1981–2015)
2004 – Rodney Alexander, while U.S. Representative from Louisiana (2004–2013)
 2004 – Steve Beren
 2004 – Ralph Doxey, Mississippi State Senator
 2005 – Michael Diven, Pennsylvania State Representative
 2005 – Dan Morrish, Louisiana State Representative
 2006 – Sheri McInvale, Florida State Representative
 2006 – Don McLeary, Tennessee State Senator
 2006 – John Giannetti, Maryland State Senator
 2006 – Mickey Channell, Georgia State Representative
 2006 – Will Kendrick, Florida State Representative
 2006 – Billy Montgomery,  Louisiana State Representative
 2006 – Jimmy Holley, Alabama State Senator
 2007 – James Walley, Mississippi State Senator
 2007 – Tommy Gollott, Mississippi State Senator
 2007 – Dawn Pettengill, Iowa State Representative
 2007 – Frank A. Howard, Sheriff of Vernon Parish
 2007 – Mike Jacobs, Georgia State Representative
 2007 – John Neely Kennedy, State Treasurer of Louisiana. Later U.S. Senator for Louisiana (2017–present)
 2007 – Robert Adley, Louisiana State Senator
 2008 – Nolan Mettetal, Mississippi State Senator
 2008 – Sid Bondurant, Mississippi State Representative
 2009 – Chuck Hopson, Texas State Representative
 2009 – Billy Nicholson, Mississippi State Representative
 2009 – Tom Salmon, Vermont Auditor of Accounts
 2009 – Tom Saviello, Maine State Representative, elected to Maine Senate as a Republican in 2010

2010–2019
 2010 – Steve Levy, County Executive of Suffolk County, New York
 2010 – C. Scott Bounds, Mississippi State Representative
 2010 – Scott Angelle, Lieutenant Governor of Louisiana (2010). Later Director of the Bureau of Safety and Environmental Enforcement (2017–present)
 2010 – Alan Boothe, Alabama State Representative
 2010 – Steve Hurst, Alabama State Representative
 2010 – Mike Millican, Alabama State Representative
 2010 – Lesley Vance, Alabama State Representative
 2010 – Ellis Black, Georgia State Representative
 2010 – Amy Carter, Georgia State Representative
 2010 – Mike Cheokas, Georgia State Representative
 2010 – Bubber Epps, Georgia State Representative
 2010 – Gerald Greene, Georgia State Representative
 2010 – Bob Hanner, Georgia State Representative
 2010 – Doug McKillip, Georgia State Representative
 2010 – Alan Powell, Georgia State Representative
 2010 – Tim Golden, Georgia State Senator
 2010 – Chris Steineger, Kansas State Senator
 2010 – Simone B. Champagne, Louisiana State Representative
 2010 – Noble Ellington, Louisiana State Representative
 2010 – Walker Hines, Louisiana State Representative
 2010 – Fred Mills, Louisiana State Representative
 2010 – Jim Preuitt, Alabama State Senator
 2010 – John Alario, Louisiana State Senator
 2010 – John Smith, Louisiana State Senator
 2010 – Mike Willette, Maine State Representative
 2010 – Bobby Shows, Mississippi State Representative
 2010 – Cindy Hyde-Smith, Mississippi State Senator, State Agriculture Commissioner, United States Senator
 2010 – Eldon Nygaard, South Dakota State Senator
 2010 – Aaron Pena, Texas State Representative
 2010 – Allan Ritter, Texas State Representative
 2011 – Tom Butler, Alabama State Senator
 2011 – Buddy Caldwell, Louisiana Attorney General (2008–2016)
 2011 – Russ Nowell, Mississippi State Representative
 2011 – Margaret Rogers, Mississippi State Representative
 2011 – Jeff Smith, Mississippi State Representative
 2011 – Ezell Lee, Mississippi State Senator
 2011 – Charles Graddick,  Alabama Circuit Judge and former attorney general of Alabama (1979–1987)
 2011 – Charles "Bubba" Chaney, Louisiana State Representative
 2011 – Billy Chandler, Louisiana State Representative
 2011 – Mike "Pete" Huval,  Louisiana State Representative
 2011 – Bob Hensgens, Mayor of Gueydan, Louisiana
 2011 – Jody Amedee, Louisiana State Senator
 2011 – Norby Chabert, Louisiana State Senator
 2011 – Mark Grisanti, New York State Senator,
 2011 – Linda Collins, Arkansas State Representative
 2011 – Taylor Barras, Louisiana State Representative
 2011 – Bert Jones, North Carolina State Representative
 2011 – Jim Slezak, Michigan State Representative
 2011 – Gray Tollison, Mississippi State Senator
 2011 – Donnie Bell, Mississippi State Representative
 2011 – Sarah Maestas-Barnes, New Mexico State Representative 
 2012 – J. M. Lozano, Texas State Representative
 2012 – Roy Schmidt, Michigan State Representative
 2012 – Arthur J. Williams, North Carolina State Representative
 2012 – Christine Watkins, Utah State Representative
 2012 – Jason White, Mississippi State Representative
 2012 – Alan Harper, Alabama State Representative
 2012 – Jerry L. Fielding, Alabama State Senator
 2013 – Lindsey Holmes, Alaska State Representative
 2013 – Nickey Browning, Mississippi State Senator
 2013 – Elbert Guillory, Louisiana State Senator
 2013 – Rick Ward, III, Louisiana State Senator
 2013 – James R. Fannin, Louisiana State Representative
 2013 – Andy Nuñez, New Mexico State Representative
 2013 – Ryan Ferns, West Virginia State Representative
 2014 – Charles Newton, Alabama State Representative
 2014 – Andy Nuñez, New Mexico State Representative
 2014 – Randall Patterson, Mississippi State Representative
 2014 – Daniel Hall, West Virginia State Senator
 2014 – Linda Black, Missouri State Representative
 2014 – Mark Miloscia, Washington State Representative
 2014 – Gene Taylor, former U.S. Representative from Mississippi (1989–2011)
 2015 – Mike Holcomb, Arkansas State Representative
 2015 – Kim Davis, County Clerk of Rowan County, Kentucky
 2015 – Jody Steverson, Mississippi State Representative
 2015 – Denver Butler, Kentucky State Representative
 2015 – Carlyle Begay, Arizona State Senator
 2015 – Jim Gooch, Kentucky State Representative
 2015 – Eric Greitens, later Governor of Missouri (2016–2018)
 2015 – Omarosa Manigault, later director of communications for the Office of Public Liaison (2017)
 2016 – Karen MacBeth, Rhode Island State Representative
 2016 – Yancey McGill, Lieutenant Governor of South Carolina (2014–2015)
 2016 – David Hillman, Arkansas State Representative
 2016 – Jeff Wardlaw, Arkansas State Representative
 2016 – Joe Jett, Arkansas State Representative
 2016 – Wilbur Ross, later United States Secretary of Commerce (2017–present)
 2017 – Michelle Rehwinkel Vasilinda, former Florida State Representative
 2017 – Mariellen MacKay, New Hampshire State Representative
 2017 – William Brisson, North Carolina Assemblyman
 2017 – Rupert Phillips, West Virginia State Delegate
 2018 – Bobby Bright, former U.S. Representative from Alabama (2009–2011)
 2018 – Ken Luttrell, Oklahoma State Representative
 2018 – Johnny Tadlock, Oklahoma State Representative
 2018 – Ivanka Trump, Daughter of President Donald Trump, Advisor to the President
 2019 – Nick Bain, Mississippi State Representative
 2019 – Carroll Hubbard, former U.S. Representative from Kentucky (1975–1993)
 2019 – Jeff Van Drew, U.S Representative from New Jersey (2019–present)
 2019 – Wanda Vázquez Garced, Governor of Puerto Rico (2019–2021) and former Secretary of Justice of Puerto Rico (2017–2019)

2020–present

2020 – Jason Barrett, West Virginia State Representative
 2021 – Vernon Jones, Georgia State Representative
 2021 – John Jay Lee, North Las Vegas Mayor
 2021 – Mick Bates, West Virginia State Delegate
 2021 – Ryan Guillen, Texas State Representative
 2022 – Glenn Jeffries, West Virginia State Senator 
 2023 – Francis Thompson, Louisiana State Representative

Democratic to other (third) party
 1878 – Hendrick Bradley Wright, U.S Representative from Pennsylvania (1853–1855, 1861–1863 and 1877–1881), ran for reelection on the Greenback Party
 1884 – Absolom M. West, member of the Mississippi State Senate. He joined the Greenback Party and was their vice presidential candidate in 1884.
 1996 – Daniel Hamburg, former U.S. Representative (1993–1995) to Green Party
 1999 – Audie Bock, California State Assemblywoman to Green Party
 2000 – Matt Gonzalez, Supervisor of the San Francisco Board of Supervisors to Green Party.
 2003 – Matt Ahearn, New Jersey State Representative to Green Party.
 2002 – Tim Penny, former U.S Representative from Minnesota (1983–1995) to Independence Party of Minnesota
 2005 – Jim Lendall, Arkansas State Representative joined the Green Party.
 2006 – Bill Paparian, Mayor of Pasadena to Green Party.
 2007 – Cynthia McKinney, former U.S. Representative from Georgia (1993–2003 and 2005–2007) to Green Party
 2012 – Fred Smith, Arkansas State Representative to Green Party.
 2017 – Henry John Bear, Maine State Representative to Maine Green Independent Party.
 2017 – Ralph Chapman, Maine State Representative to Maine Green Independent Party.
 2017 – Joseph Stallcop, New Hampshire State Representative to Libertarian Party
 2018 – Shane Robinson, Maryland House Representative to Maryland Green Party.

Democratic to independent

 1970 – Harry F. Byrd Jr., while U.S. Senator from Virginia (1965–1983)
 2006 – Joe Lieberman, while U.S. Senator from Connecticut (1989–2013), to run as an independent, on the Connecticut for Lieberman ballot line, for US Senate in Connecticut, after losing to challenger Ned Lamont in the Democratic primary.
 2006 – Avel Gordly, Oregon State Senator.
 2009 – Timothy P. Cahill, Treasurer and Receiver-General of Massachusetts (2003–2011)
 2009 – Juan Arambula, California State Assemblyman
 2009 – Kathleen Curry, Colorado State Representative
 2010 – Bob Ziegelbauer, Wisconsin State Assemblyman.
 2013 – Richard Laird, Alabama State Representative
 2013 – John Olumba, Michigan State Representative.
 2014 – Terry Hayes, Maine State Treasurer.
 2015 – Keith English, Missouri State Representative.
 2015 – Paul Tine, North Carolina State Representative.
 2016 – Ben Jones, former U.S. Representative from Georgia (1989–1993).
 2016 – Mike Huether, Mayor of Sioux Falls, South Dakota.
 2017 – Denise Harlow, Maine State Representative
 2017 – Martin Grohman, Maine State Representative
 2017 – Cheri Jahn, Colorado State Senator
 2019 – Stephen Holland and Angela Cockerham, Mississippi State Representatives
 2019 – John Yudichak, Pennsylvania State Senator
 2021 – Andrew Yang, candidate in the 2020 Democratic Party presidential primaries and the 2021 New York City Democratic mayoral primary
 2021 – Malinda White, Louisiana State Representative
 2021 – Betsy Johnson, Oregon State Senator
 2022 – Tulsi Gabbard, former U.S. Representative from Hawaii (2013–2021)
 2022 – Kyrsten Sinema, U.S. Senator from Arizona

Switches by Republicans

Republican to Democratic

Before 1960
 1860s – Henry George
 1860s – Andrew Gregg Curtin, former governor of Pennsylvania (1861–1867), later U.S. Congressman from Pennsylvania (1881–1887)
 1860s – Alonzo Garcelon, later served as Governor of Maine (1879–1880)
 1867 – John Quincy Adams II, member of the Massachusetts House of Representatives and grandson of President John Quincy Adams
 1868 – Salmon P. Chase, former senator from Ohio (1849–1855, 1861), Governor of Ohio (1856–1860) and Secretary of the Treasury (1861–1864) and later Chief Justice of the United States (1864–1873)
 1872 – Edmund G. Ross, former U.S. Senator from Kansas (1866–1871)
 1877 – James B. Weaver, later U.S. Representative from Iowa (1879–1889)
 1880 – Benjamin Butler, former U.S. Representative from Massachusetts (1867–1879), later Governor of Massachusetts (1883–1884)
 1880 – C. H. J. Taylor, African American journalist. He was later Minister of Liberia (1887–1888) and Recorder of Deeds for the District of Columbia (1893–1897)
 1893 – George Edwin Taylor, newspaper editor and later president of the National Negro Democratic League.
 1905 – John Francis Wheaton, previously first African American to serve in the Minnesota House of Representatives (1899–1900)
 1920s – Ferdinand Lee Barnett, founding editor of The Chicago Conservator and husband of Ida B. Wells.
 1922 – Royal S. Copeland, later U.S. Senator from New York (1923–1938)
 1930s – Charles Edison, later the 42nd Governor of New Jersey (1941–1944).
 1932 – Robert Lee Vann, publisher and editor of the Pittsburgh Courier
 1932 – Mary McLeod Bethune, activist and member of the Black Cabinet during Franklin D. Roosevelt's administration.
 1932 – Robert Russa Moton, principal of Tuskegee Institute.
 1932 – Phelps Phelps, New York Assemblyman, later Governor of American Samoa (1951–1952)
 1932 – Arthur W. Mitchell, later U.S. Representative from Illinois (1935–1943)
 1932 – Charles Diggs Sr., later member of the Michigan Senate (1937–1944).
 1936 – Ellis E. Patterson, California state assemblyman, later Lieutenant Governor of California (1939–1943) and U.S. Representative from California (1945–1947)
 1936 – Elizabeth Simpson Drewry, later the first African American member of the West Virginia House of Delegates (1951–1966)
 1939 – William L. Dawson, later U.S. Representative from Illinois (1943–1970)
 1939 – Corneal A. Davis, later a member of the Illinois House of Representatives (1943–1979)
 1940 – Perle Mesta, later United States Ambassador to Luxembourg (1949–1953)
 1940 – George W. Crockett, Jr., later Congressman from Michigan's 13th congressional district (1980–1991)
 1951 – James C. Oliver, former U.S. Representative from Maine (1937–1943), Democratic nominee for Governor of Maine in 1952, later served as U.S. Representative from Maine (1959–1961).

1960–1969
 1960s – Pete Stark, later served as U.S. Representative from California (1973–2013)
 1960s – Howard Dean, later Lieutenant Governor of Vermont (1987–1991), Governor of Vermont (1991–2003) and Chair of the Democratic National Committee (2005–2009)
 1960s – Archibald Carey Jr., later Mayor of Shreveport, Louisiana
 1962 – Calhoun Allen, Commissioner of Public Utilities
 1962 – Don Edwards, later Congressman from California (1963–1995).
 1966 – Jay Rockefeller, later United States Senator from West Virginia (1985-2015)
 1968 – Hillary Clinton, later First Lady of the United States (1993–2001), U.S. Senator from New York (2001–2009), United States Secretary of State (2009–2013) and nominee of the Democratic Party for President of the United States in the 2016 election.

1970–1979
1970 – Floyd K. Haskell, later served as U.S. Senator from Colorado (1973–1979)
1970 – William G. Barr, while Illinois State Representative
1971 – John Lindsay, Mayor of New York City
1971 – Leon Panetta, later served as U.S. Representative from California (1977–1993), White House Chief of Staff (1994–1997), Director of the C.I.A. (2009–2011) and U.S. Secretary of Defense (2011–2013)
1972 – Ogden R. Reid, while U.S. Representative from New York (1963–1975)
1972 – Herman Goldner, Mayor of St. Petersburg
1972 – Harvey Milk, later a member of the San Francisco Board of Supervisors (1978).
1973 – Joan Finney, later Kansas State Treasurer (1974–1991) and Governor of Kansas (1991–1995)
1973 – Don Riegle, while U.S. representative from Michigan (1967–1976) and later U.S. Senator from Michigan (1976–1995)
1973 – Edward Meyer, New York State Assemblyman 
1974 – Patrick A. Ribellia, Hawaii State Representative 
1976 – James Glisson, Florida State Senator
1976 – Howard Oda, Hawaii State Representative
1976 – James Aki, Hawaii State Representative
1977 – Lloyd H. Kincaid, Wisconsin State Assemblyman
1977 – Peter Peyser, U.S. Representative from New York (1971–1977 and 1979–1983)
1978 – John Peavey, Idaho State Senator
1978 – Robert McNamara, US Secretary of Defence (1961–1968)

1980–1989
1980 – Thomas M. Foglietta, Member of the Philadelphia City Council, later served as U.S. Representative from Pennsylvania (1981–1997) and United States Ambassador to Italy (1997–2001)
1985 – John Yarmuth, later served as U.S. Representative from Kentucky (2007–2023)
1985 – Chris Coons, later U.S. Senator from Delaware (2010–present)
1987 – Martha Ezzard, Colorado State Senator
1987 – Patrick A. Ribellia, Hawaii State Representative
1988 – Albio Sires, later served as U.S. Representative from New Jersey (2006–present)
1988 – Duane Woodard, Colorado Attorney General
1988 – Donna Akeda, Hawaii State Representative
1988 – Ann Kobayashi, Hawaii State Senator
1988 – Milton Marks, California State Senator

1990–1999
 1991 – Markos Moulitsas, later founder of Daily Kos
 1992 – Loretta Sanchez, later served as U.S. Representative from California (1997–2017)
 1992 – Frank Pecora, Pennsylvania State Senator
 1992 – Mike Doyle, later served as U.S. Representative from Pennsylvania (1995–2022)
 1992 – Mark Takano, later served as U.S. Representative from California (2013–present)
 1994 – Bernard Erickson, Texas State Representative
 1995 – Elizabeth Warren, later served as U.S. Senator from Massachusetts (2013–present)
 1996 – Carolyn McCarthy, later served as U.S. Representative from New York (1997–2015)
 1996 – Ralph Neas, executive director of the Leadership Conference on Civil Rights
 1996 – Russell W. Peterson, former governor of Delaware (1969–1973)
 1997 – Debra J. Mazzarelli, New York State Assemblywoman
 1997 – Harley Rouda, later served as U.S. Representative for California (2019–2021)
 1999 – Michael Forbes, while serving as U.S. Representative from New York (1995–2001)
1999 – Gabrielle Giffords, later U.S. Representative from Arizona (2007–2012)

2000–2009
2000 – Jeff Enfinger, Alabama State Senator
2000 – Scott Heidepriem, South Dakota State Senator
2000 – Dean Elton Johnson, Minnesota State Senator.
2000 – Mark DeSaulnier, Contra Costa County Supervisor. Later U.S. Representative for California (2015–present)
2000 – Judi Dutcher, Minnesota State Auditor (1995–2003)
2000 – Margaret Gamble, South Carolina State Representative
2000 – Mickey Whatley, South Carolina State Representative
2000 – Randy Sauder, Georgia State Representative
2000 – Ed Schultz 
2001 – John A. Lawless, Pennsylvania House of Representatives.
2001 – Kathy Ashe, Georgia State Representative
2001 – Barbara McIlvaine Smith, Pennsylvania State Representative
2002 – D. G. Anderson, Hawaii State Senator
2002 – Charles R. Larson, former Superintendent of United States Naval Academy (1983–1986 and 1994–1998). 
2002 – Ray Nagin, later Mayor of New Orleans (2002–2010)
2002 – Douglas Stalnaker, West Virginia House of Delegates
2003 – Michael Decker, North Carolina State Representative
2003 – Barbara Hafer, State Treasurer of Pennsylvania (1997–2005)
2003 – Corey Corbin, New Hampshire State Representative
2003 – Stan Moody, Maine State Representative
2003 – Nancy Boyda, later served as U.S. Representative from Kansas (2007–2009)
2003 – John E. Moore, later Lieutenant Governor of Kansas (2003–2007)
2003 – Bazy Tankersley, horse breeder, conservationist, and daughter of Senator Joseph M. McCormick.
2004 – Arthur Mayo, Maine State Senator
2004 – Scott Dix, Georgia State Representative
2004 – Teresa Heinz, Widow of Senator John Heinz and Current wife of John Kerry.
2005 – Tim Mahoney, later served as U.S. Representative for Florida (2007–2009)
2005 – Paul J. Morrison, district attorney for Johnson County, Kansas, later Kansas Attorney General (2006–2007)
2005 – Steve Lukert, Kansas State Representative
2006 – James Webb, former United States Secretary of the Navy (1987–1988), later U.S. Senator from Virginia (2007–2013)
2006 – Mark Parkinson, Kansas State Senator, later Lieutenant Governor of Kansas (2007–2009) and Governor of Kansas (2009–2011)
2006 – Charles Barkley
2006 – Nancy Riley, Oklahoma State Senator
2006 – Kate Witek, Nebraska Auditor of Public Accounts (1999–2007)
2006 – Sam Kitzenberg, Montana State Senator.
2006 – Rodney Tom, Washington State Representative
 2006 – Diana Urban, Connecticut State Representative
 2006 – Cindy Neighbor, Kansas State Representative
 2006 – Wendy Davis, Member of the Fort Worth City Council, later Texas State Senator and 2014 Democratic nominee for Governor of Texas
 2007 – Pete McCloskey, former U.S. Representative from California (1967–1983)
 2007 – Walter Boasso, Louisiana State Senator
 2007 – Janet DiFiore, district attorney of Westchester County, New York
 2007 – Paul D. Froehlich, Illinois State Representative.
 2007 – Robert Garcia, later Mayor of Long Beach, California
 2007 – Mike Spano, New York State Assemblyman
 2007 – Chris Koster, Missouri State Senator, later Missouri Attorney General (2009–2017) and 2016 Democratic nominee for Governor of Missouri
 2007 – Milward Dedman, Kentucky State Representative
 2007 – Melvin B. Henley, Kentucky State Representative
 2007 – Kirk England, Texas State Representative
 2007 – James Hovland, Mayor of Edina, Minnesota
 2007 – Francis Bodine, New Jersey State Representative
 2007 – Debbie Stafford, Colorado State Representative
 2007 – Fred Jarrett, Washington State Representative
 2007 – Karen Awana, Hawaii State Representative
 2007 – Mike Gabbard, Hawaii State Senator
 2008 – David L. Hogue, Utah State Representative
 2008 – Stacey Plaskett, later served as Delegate to the U.S. House of Representatives from the United States Virgin Islands (2015–present).
 2008 – Gil Cisneros, later served as U.S. Representative for California (2019–2021) 
 2009 – Dale Swenson, Kansas State Representative

2010–2019
2010 – Steve Fox, California State Assemblyman
2011 – Wade Hurt, Kentucky State Representative
2011 – Patrick Murphy, later served as U.S. Representative from Florida (2013–2017)
2012 – Ron Erhardt, Minnesota State Representative
2012 – Gil Riviere, while Hawaii State Representative
2012 – Peter Koo, New York City Councilman
2013 – Jean Schodorf, Kansas State Senator
2013 – Tom O'Halleran, Arizona State Senator, later U.S. Representative from Arizona (2017–2023).
2013 – Brad Ashford, Nebraska State Senator, later U.S. Representative from Nebraska (2015–2017)
2013 – John Bohlinger, former lieutenant governor of Montana (2005–2013)
2013 – Lawrence E. Meyers, Texas Court of Criminal Appeals Judge.
 2013 – Nathan Fletcher, California State Assemblyman.
 2014 – Aaron Johanson, Hawaii State Representative
 2014 – Ana Rivas Logan, previously a member of the Florida Senate.
 2015 – John Ceretto, New York State Assemblyman
 2015 – Jane Castor, later Mayor of Tampa (2019–present).
 2016 – William Mundell, former Arizona Corporation Commissioner
 2017 – Beth Fukumoto, Hawaii State Representative and Republican Minority Leader.
 2018 – Bob Krist, Nebraska State Senator
 2018 – Richard Painter, Chief White House Ethics Lawyer (2005–2007)
 2018 – Steve Schmidt, political strategist and operations chief for John McCain's 2008 presidential campaign, as well as co-founder of The Lincoln Project.
 2018 – Meagan Simonaire, Maryland State Delegate
 2018 – Grant Woods, former attorney general of Arizona (1991–1999)
 2018 – Barbara Bollier, Kansas State Senator
 2018 – Joy Koesten, Kansas State Representative
 2018 – Stephanie Clayton, Kansas State Representative
 2018 – Dinah Sykes, Kansas State Senator
 2019 – Brian Maienschein, while California State Assemblyman
 2019 – Dawn Addiego, New Jersey State Senator
 2019 – Andy McKean, Iowa State Representative
 2019 – Wayne Gilchrest, former U.S. Representative from Maryland (1991–2009).

2020–present
 2020 – Frank Aguilar, member of the Cook County Board of Commissioners. Previously served in the Illinois House of Representatives
 2021 – William Marsh, New Hampshire State Representative
 2021 – Joy Hofmeister, Oklahoma Superintendent of Public Instruction
 2021 – Jennifer McCormick, former Indiana Superintendent of Public Instruction (2017–2021)
 2022 – Jim Leach, former U.S. Representative from Iowa (1977–2007)
 2022 – Kevin Priola, Colorado State Senator
 2023 – Samuel D. Thompson, New Jersey State Senator

Republican to other (third) party
 1891 – James Weaver, Republican turned Greenbacker, later was a founder of the Populist Party and ran for president on that party's ticket in 1892.
1893 – William M. Stewart, U.S. Senator from Nevada (1864–1875 and 1887–1905) switched to the Silver Party
1895 – John P. Jones, U.S. Senator from Nevada (1873–1903) switched to Silver Party
1896 – Wharton Barker switched to the Populist Party.
1896 – Lee Mantle, U.S. Senator from Montana (1895–1899) switched to Silver Republican Party.
1896 – Richard F. Pettigrew, U.S. Senator from South Dakota (1889–1901) switched to Silver Republican Party.
1896 – Frank J. Cannon, U.S. Senator from Utah (1896–1899) switched to Silver Republican Party.
1897 – Henry M. Teller, U.S. Senator from Colorado (1876–1882 and 1885–1909) switched to Silver Republican Party
1897 – Fred T. Dubois, U.S. Senator from Idaho (1891–1897 and 1901–1907) switched to Silver Republican Party.
 1934 – Robert M. La Follette Jr., U.S. Senator from Wisconsin (1925–1947) switched to the Progressive Party.
 1937 – Vito Marcantonio, U.S. Representative from New York (1935–1937 and 1939–1951) switched to the Labor Party
 2000 – Rick Jore, Montana State Representative to U.S. Constitution Party.
 2012 – Gary Johnson, former governor of New Mexico (1995–2003), switched to the Libertarian Party and became their nominee for President of the United States in both the 2012 election and 2016 election.
 2012 – Buddy Roemer, former governor of Louisiana (1988–1992), switched to the Reform Party.
 2012 – Daniel P. Gordon, Rhode Island State Representative joined the Libertarian Party.
 2016 – William Weld, former governor of Massachusetts (1991–1997), switched to the Libertarian Party
 2016 – John Moore, Nevada Assemblyman switched to Libertarian Party
 2016 – Laura Ebke, Nebraska State Senator, switched to the Libertarian Party.
 2016 – Mary Matalin, deputy campaign manager for George H. W. Bush's 1992 presidential campaign, switched to Libertarian Party
 2016 – Mark B. Madsen, Utah State Senator, switched to the Libertarian Party.
 2017 – Caleb Dyer, New Hampshire State Representative switched to the Libertarian Party
 2017 – Brandon Phinney, New Hampshire State Representative switched to the Libertarian Party
 2018 – Sam McCann, Illinois State Senator switched to the Conservative Party.
 2018 – Aubrey Dunn Jr., New Mexico Commissioner of Public Lands switched to the Libertarian Party.
 2019–20 – Justin Amash, Former US Congressman from Michigan, became Independent in July 2019, then affiliated with the Libertarian Party in April 2020

Republican to independent

 1936 – George William Norris, U.S. Senator from Nebraska (1913–1943)
 1980 – John Anderson, U.S. Representative from Illinois (1961–1981).
 1990 – Lowell Weicker, former U.S. Senator for Connecticut (1971–1989). Later Independent Governor of Connecticut (1991–1995)
 2001 – James M. Jeffords, U.S. senator from Vermont (1989–2007).
 2005 – David Durenberger, former U.S. Senator from Minnesota (1979–1995).
 2007 – Rick Singleton, Rhode Island State Representative
 2007 – Micheal R. Williams, Tennessee State Senator
 2008 – Ron Erhardt, Minnesota State Representative.
 2009 – Jim Campbell, Maine State Representative
 2014 – Larry Pressler, former U.S. Senator from South Dakota (1979–1997)
 2014 – Sue Wagner, former lieutenant governor of Nevada (1991–1995)
 2014 – Bill Walker, later Independent Governor of Alaska (2014–2018)
 2015 – Nate Bell, Arkansas State Representative.
 2016 – Tom Campbell, former U.S. Representative from California (1989–2001).
 2016 – Larry Dunphy, Maine State Representative
 2016 – Gordon J. Humphrey, former U.S. Senator from New Hampshire (1979–1990)
 2016 – David Johnson, Iowa State Senator
 2016 – Evan McMullin, Republican congressional staff member until July 2016, launched an independent presidential campaign in August 2016
 2016 – George Will
 2017 – Joe Scarborough, former U.S. Representative from Florida (1995–2001) and host of Morning Joe
 2017 – Rick Wilson, political strategist and operations chief for Evan McMullin 2016 presidential campaign, as well as co-founder of The Lincoln Project.
 2017 – Kevin Battle, Maine State Representative
 2017 – Norm Higgins, Maine State Representative
 2018 – Charles Djou, former U.S. Representative from Hawaii (2010–2011)
 2018 – John Doll, Kansas State Senator
 2018 – Steve Poizner, former California Insurance Commissioner (2007–2011)
 2018 – Tani Cantil-Sakauye, Chief Justice of the California Supreme Court (2011–present)
 2018 – David Jolly, former U.S. Congressman from Florida
 2020 – Joe Walsh, former U.S. Congressman from Illinois
 2020 – Paul Mitchell, former U.S. Congressman from Michigan
 2021 – Knute Buehler, former Oregon State Senator and Oregon gubernatorial nominee in 2018
 2021 – Phelps Anderson, New Mexico State Representative
 2021 – Arnold Palacios, Lieutenant Governor of the Northern Mariana Islands
 2021 – Joe Camacho, Northern Mariana Islands State Representative
2021 – Jim Hendren, Arkansas State Senator
 2022 – Denver Riggleman, former U.S. Representative from Virginia (2019–2021)
 2022 – Dennis Pyle, Kansas State Senator

Switches by independents or other parties

Independent or other party to Democratic
1955 – Wayne Morse, U.S. Senator from Oregon (1945–1969), changed from an Independent to a Democrat on February 17, 1955
1996 – Walt Minnick, later Congressman from Idaho's 1st congressional district (2009–2011)
 2002 – Joe Bertram, switched from the Green Party.
 2004 – Peter Clavelle, while Mayor of Burlington left the Vermont Progressive Party.
 2004 – Kyrsten Sinema, left the Green Party. Later U.S. Representative from Arizona (2013–2019) and U.S. Senator from Arizona (2019–present).
 2006 – David Segal, initially elected as a Green to the Providence City Council, he joined the Democratic Party to run for the Rhode Island House of Representatives, where he served from 2007 to 2011.
 2009 – Richard Carroll, Arkansas Representative. At the time of his switch, he was the only Green Party state legislator in the United States.
 2015 – Ben Chipman, Maine State Representative.

Independent or other party to Republican
1941 – Henrik Shipstead, while U.S. Senator from Minnesota, switched from the Farmer-Labor Party to the Republican Party.
 2011 – Joel Robideaux, while a Louisiana State Representative. He was initially elected as an independent.
2016 – Blake Filippi, Rhode Island State Representative, switched from Independent to Republican; he had also been Republican previously until 2012.
2022 – Malinda White, while a Louisiana State Representative, switched from Independent to Republican; she had been a Democrat until 2021.

Multiple party switches

Democratic to Republican to Democratic
 1854 – Francis Preston Blair, a supporter of presidents Andrew Jackson and Abraham Lincoln who became disillusioned with radical Reconstruction policies.
 1854 – Francis Preston Blair Jr., Democratic nominee for Vice President of the United States in 1868.  His family had been unwavering supporters of Republican Abraham Lincoln, but he opposed the post-war Reconstruction policy.  He had earlier been a friend of Democrat Thomas Hart Benton, and like his father he had also been a member of the Free Soil Party.
 1854 – Montgomery Blair, Postmaster General for President Lincoln.  His family left the Democratic Party to join the Republican Party, but he re-joined the Democratic Party after the war.
 1965 – Arlen Specter, U.S. Senator from Pennsylvania (1981–2011). He was a Republican from 1965 to 2009 and a Democrat from 1951 to 1965 and 2009 to 2012.
 2003 – Tommy Dickerson, Mississippi State Senator.
 2003 – Johnny Ford, Alabama State Representative.
 2008 – Jim Bradford, South Dakota State Representative.
 2009 – Parker Griffith, former U.S. Representative from Alabama (2009–2011). Joined the Republican Party in 2009, but returned to the Democratic Party in 2014.
 2012 – Artur Davis, former U.S. Representative from Alabama (2003–2011). Joined the Republican Party in 2012, but returned to the Democratic Party in 2015.
 2015 – Joe Baca, former U.S. Representative from California (1999–2013). Joined the Republican Party in 2015, but returned to the Democratic Party in 2018.

Republican to Democratic to Republican
 1960 – Jerry Solomon, later U.S. Representative from New York (1979–1999)
 1974 – Matthew G. Martinez, U.S. Representative from California (1982–2001)
 1992 – Evan Jenkins, West Virginia State Delegate. Later U.S. Representative for West Virginia (2015–2019)
 1997 – Betsy McCaughey, Lieutenant Governor of New York (1995–1998)
 2001 – Robert R. Neall, Maryland State Senator.
 2017 – Jim Justice, Governor of West Virginia (2017–present).
2018 – Daniel Boman, Alabama State Representative.

Other variations

 1890 – Thomas E. Watson switched to the Populist Party. Later U.S. Senator for Georgia as a Democrat (1921–1922).
 1908 – Theodore A. Bell, former U.S. Representative from California (1903–1905). He ran in several elections under different party's banners.
 1913 – Miles Poindexter, U.S. Senator from Washington (1911–1923) switched to the Progressive Party until rejoining the Republican Party two years later.
 1936 – Henry A. Wallace, United States Secretary of Agriculture (1933–1940), Vice President of the United States (1941–1945), United States Secretary of Commerce (1945–1946). He was a Republican, then a Democrat (1932-1947), then a Progressive (1947-1953)
1974 – D. French Slaughter Jr., while serving in the Virginia House of Delegates became an independent.  Later elected to Congress as a Republican (1985–1991).
1976 – Harold L. Silverman, elected as a Republican to the Maine House of Representatives (1973–1976), resigned to become a staffer to independent Governor James B. Longley, elected as an independent to the Maine Senate (1979–1980), Democratic nominee for Maine's 2nd congressional district in 1980.
 1988 – Ron Paul, former U.S. Representative (1976–1977 and 1979–1985), ran for president as a Libertarian. He later returned to Congress as a Republican (1997–2012).
 1990 – Walter Hickel, former United States Secretary of the Interior (1969–1970) left Republican Party before his successful bid for Governor of Alaska (1966–1969 and 1990–1994), as nominee of the Alaskan Independence Party. He rejoined the Republican party in 1994.
 1994 – Wes Watkins, Democratic U.S Congressman from Oklahoma (1977–1991), Democratic (1990) & Independent (1994) candidate for Governor of Oklahoma and Republican U.S. Congressman from Oklahoma (1997–2003)
 1999 – Bob Smith, U.S. Senator from New Hampshire (1990–2003), left the Republican Party on July 13, 1999, while running for the party's presidential nomination; became an independent and declared himself a candidate for the U.S. Taxpayers Party presidential nomination and an independent candidate. On November 1, 1999, he returned to the Republican Party when a Senate committee chairmanship became open.
 1999 – Donald Trump, businessman and real-estate developer, later 45th President of the United States has been at various times a Republican, Democratic, Independent, and Reform Party member.
 1999 – Joel Giambra, city comptroller of Buffalo, New York (1990–1999), County Executive of Erie County, New York (2000–2007). He joined the Republican Party in 1999. In 2018, he joined the Reform Party of New York State to run for governor.
 2000 – Virgil Goode, former U.S. Representative from Virginia (1997–2009). Initially a Democrat, he sat as an Independent and later a Republican during his time in Congress. After Congress, he switched to the Constitution Party and became their nominee for President of the United States in the 2012 election.
 2001 – Michael Bloomberg, was a Democratic before running for Mayor of New York City as a Republican. He later became an independent before rejoining the Democratic Party in 2018.
 2002 – Sheila Kiscaden, while a Minnesota state senator. She joined and won reelection as the Independence Party of Minnesota candidate before accepting an invitation to join the Minnesota Democratic–Farmer–Labor Party in 2006.
 2008 – Mike Gravel, former U.S. Senator from Alaska (1969–1981) and 2008 presidential candidate switched from Democrat to Libertarian before returning to the Democratic Party in 2010.
 2009 – Jared Kushner, former Senior Advisor to the President (2017–2021) and Director of the Office of American Innovation (2017–2021), has been at various times a Democrat, Independent, and Republican.
 2012 – Charlie Crist, former Republican governor of Florida (2007–2011) and Independent senatorial candidate in 2010, switched to Democrat, then elected as Democratic US Congressman (2017-2022).
 2017 – Tom Tancredo, former U.S. Representative from Colorado (1999–2009), switched to the Constitution Party to run for Governor of Colorado, returned to Republican Party in 2011, became an Independent in 2015, returned to the Republican Party again in 2017
 2019 – Lincoln Chafee, former Independent and Democratic Governor of Rhode Island (2011–2015), former Republican U.S. Senator for Rhode Island (1999–2007), switched from Republican to Independent in 2007, switched from Independent to Democrat in 2013 while serving as Governor of Rhode Island, ran for President in the 2016 Democratic Party presidential primaries, switched to Libertarian Party in 2019
 2021 – Colin Powell, former United States Secretary of State under George W. Bush (2001–2005), former Chairman of the Joint Chiefs of Staff under George H. W. Bush and Bill Clinton (1989–1993), former National Security Advisor under Ronald Reagan (1986–1989) switched from Independent to Republican in 1995. After supporters of President Donald Trump stormed the U.S. Capitol in January 2021, Powell said that he could no longer call himself a fellow Republican. He switched back to Independent.

Within other parties
 2000 – Jesse Ventura, while governor of Minnesota, left the Reform Party, along with most of his supporters, to re-found the Independence Party of Minnesota.

See also
List of American politicians who switched parties in office
List of United States representatives who switched parties
List of United States senators who switched parties

References

Party switchers